Coast Guard Station Ponce de Leon Inlet is a United States Coast Guard boat station located in New Smyrna Beach, Florida and is part of the Coast Guard 7th District, Sector Jacksonville.

While in the late 1980s, the crew consisted of only 4 men, the crew at Coast Guard Station Ponce de Leon Inlet now is made of 31 active duty and 15 United States Coast Guard Reserve personnel. The Ponce de Leon Inlet Aids to Navigation Team (ANT) performs Search & Rescue, Law Enforcement and fisheries patrols. In addition also do maintenance work at the Cape Canaveral lighthouse.

References

External links

United States Coast Guard stations
Military installations in Florida
New Smyrna Beach, Florida